Chris Washington may refer to:
 Chris Washington (American footballer) (born 1962)
 Chris Washington (comedian) (born 1989)
Chris Washington, character from the film Get Out

See also:
Christopher, Washington, former community in the United States